Gisselfeld, a former monastery, is Denmark's fifth-largest estate. Located between Haslev and Næstved, it extends into several municipalities but the main building is located in Braaby Parish in Faxe Municipality. The estate measures 3,850 hectares, including Hesede, Edelesminde, Brødebæk and Gødstrupgård, of which 2,400 hectares is forest. The three-storeyed Renaissance-style building has stepped gables, loopholes and a projecting tower over the main gate. The grounds include a moat, a well-kept park, lake, waterfall, gardens, greenhouse, and a fountain. A recent addition in its forest is a 45 meter tall hyperboloid tower.

History

Falk and Goye
Gisselfeld is first mentioned at the end of the 14th century when the owner was Bo Falk. At that time, there was a small manor situated some 2 km northwest of the site of today's main building. It stood next to an older fort, possibly the now demolished Valgestrup.

Gisselfeld was later owned by Bo Falk's son Peder Falk and grandson Eskild Falk. The latter's daughter Ida was married to Mogens Axelsen Gøye. Their son,  Eskil Gøye, owned Gisselfeld from 1450. His other holdings included Krenkerup on Lolland and Turnbyholm in Skåne as well as the fiefs of Aalholm and Lindholm. He served as rigsmarsk from 1489.

Gisselfeld was upon Eskil Gøye's death in 1506 passed to his son Henrik Gøye. Krenkerup went to Henrik Jøye's elder brother Mogens Gøye. Henrik Gøye served as governor during the siege of Copenhagen. In c. 1523, he had to mortgage Gisselfeld to his cousin Otte Holgersen Rosenkrantz and brother  Mogens Gøye.

Oxe and Lykke families
Today's estate was founded by Peder Oxe til Nielstrup who built the manor from 1547 to 1575. It originally consisted of four interconnected red-brick wings, three storeys high with thick outer walls, a number of loopholes and large stepped gables. A protruding gate tower stands at the centre of the left wing. The fourth wing, now demolished, housed a chapel.

After Peder Oxe's death, his widow Mette Rosenkrantz til Vallø became the owner of the estate. After her death in 1588, her niece Karen Banner inherited Gisselfeld. She married Henrik Lykke til Overgaard whose family ran the estate until Kai Lykke was executed and relieved of all his rights in 1661.

Changing owners1661-1688

After a short period of ownership by the Crown, in 1670 the property was presented to Count Hans Schack as a reward for the part he played in the Swedish wars. In 1688, his son Otto Diderik sold the estate to Adam Levin Knuth whose family maintained ownership until 1699.

Concent

In 1699, Christian V's illegitimate son took it over. As a result of his will, on his death in 1703 the manor should have become a convent but this did not happen until the death of his widow Dorothea Krag in 1754 extinguished her dower rights. Since 1755, under the name of Danneskiold-Samsøe his descendants have run the estate as "Gisselfeld Adelige Jomfrukloster I Sjælland" (Gisselfeld Convent in Zealand for Virgins of Noble Birth). The 11th in line, Helene Danneskiold-Samsøe, has run Gisselfeld since 2010.

Geography

Gisselfeld is Denmark's fifth-largest land estate, covering an area of 3,850 hectares. It is set in a scenic forested environment in an area of lakes and hills. It was known for its wildlife and organic farming until ownership legally changed hands in 1996. Subsequently, organic farming was discontinued and replaced by logging of the forests. The hunting grounds have been leased out.

The property was surrounded by moats on three sides, the gårdsø (estate lake) flanking the north side. Water spouts from the four frogs that embellish a fountain on the property.

Legal status
In the seventeenth century Gisselfeld was within consecutive Birks, so had separate legal jurisdiction from Bråby Sogn (Braaby Parish) and old Ringsted Herred (hundred). Special inheritance laws were enacted in 1701 and 1702 that define the inheritance laws of the castles and estates, promulgated by Christian Gyldenløwe (Golden Lion), son of the Danish King Christian V. Under this law, the present Count of Gisselfeld was the director of the estate and ran this estate until 1996 when a new Board was instituted by the Ministry of Justice and the Directorate of Civil Rights. This change was challenged by the Count, and became a well-publicized legal case.

Owners
 (1381–1411) Bo Falk
 (1411–1431) Peder Falk
 (1431–1450) Eskild Falk
 (1450) Ida Falk, married Gøye
 (1450–1506) Eskil Gøye
 (1506–1526) Henrik Gøye
 (1526–1537) Johan Oxe
 (1537–1545) Torben Oxe
 (1545–1575) Peder Oxe
 (1575–1588) Mette Rosenkrantz, gift Oxe
 (1588) Karen Banner, gift Lykke
 (1588–1619) Christian Lykke
 (1619–1655) Frands Lykke
 (1655–1661) Kai Lykke
 (1661–1670) The Crown
 (1670) Hans Schack
 (1670) Ditlev von Rumohr
 (1670–1682) Hans lensgreve Schack
 (1682–1688) Otto Diderik lensgreve Schack
 (1688–1689) Sophie Dorothea Marschall, gift Schack
 (1689–1699) Adam Levin greve Knuth
 (1699–1703) Christian Gyldenløve, Count of Samsøe
 (1703–1754) Dorothea Krag gift (1) Juel (2) Gyldenløve (3) von Ahlefeldt
 (1754–1755) Dorothea Krags dødsbo
 (1755-) Gisselfeld Adelige Jomfrukloster i Sjælland

References

External links

 Official website (in Danish)

Manor houses in Faxe Municipality
Listed buildings and structures in Faxe Municipality
Buildings and structures associated with the Gøye family
Buildings and structures associated with the Oxe family
Buildings and structures associated with the Lykke family
Buildings and structures associated with the Danneskiold-Samsøe family